The practice of conducting a periodic census began in Egypt in the second millennium BC, where it was used for tax gathering and to determine fitness for military services.

Pre-modern censuses

Pharaonic era 
Censuses in Egypt first appears in the late Middle Kingdom and develops in the New Kingdom. Pharaoh Amasis, according to Herodotus, required every Egyptian to declare annually to the nomarch, "whence he gained his living". Under the Ptolemies and the Romans several censuses were conducted in Egypt by government officials.

Roman era 

Roman censuses in Egypt estimated the population at 4.5 million inhabitants in the year 14 AD and 5 million in 164 AD.

Islamic era (600 AD)
A census also took place in the era of Hesham Abdel Malek ben Marwan in the year 600 AD including the number of people, their ages and residences.

Napoleonic era (1798)
In 1798, Egypt's population was estimated at 3 million when Napoleon invaded the country.

1848 and 1868 Censuses 
After preliminary enumerations in some urban areas and villages the first countrywide census was carried out in 1848. A modern analysis of the 1848 census records, which attempts to adjust for various discrepancies in the data, concluded that Egypt's population was 4,476 million people back then. The 1848 census is said to be the first in a non-Western country to include demographic, social, and economic data on practically all individuals including females, children, and slaves.  Digitization of the 1848 and 1868 census records is underway based on documents in the National Archives of Egypt.

Modern censuses

Censos de población 
During the last 135 years, Egypt has managed to carry out around 14 official population censuses, the first being in 1882 and the last in 2017.

1882
1882 — The first census in Egypt had been carried out.  The total population was 6.7 million.

1947
According to the 1947 census, Egypt's population had reached 19 million inhabitants.

1976
A census in 1976 revealed that the population had risen to 36.6 million.

1986
In 1986, a census indicated that the population of Egypt reached a total of 50.4 million, including about 2.3 million Egyptians working in other countries.

1996
In 1996, the census found a population of 59.3 million.

2006
 In 2006, the thirteenth census in the Egyptian census series revealed that the Egypt's population hit 76.5 million inside and outside the country.

2017
A new census was done in 2017. Census day was 18 April 2017 and Egypt's population on that date was estimated to be 94,798,827.

Latest census details (2006)

Nationwide demographics

Population by sex and residence

Population by governorate

Future projections

At current pace, Egypt's population is expected to reach 160 million by 2050. However, if the current rate of reproduction diminishes, the population may be limited to 120 million by 2050. Egypt already has one of the highest real population densities in the world.

See also
Central Agency for Public Mobilization and Statistics
Demographics of Egypt
Population history of Egypt

References
General
https://web.archive.org/web/20070930225811/http://www.sis.gov.eg/En/EgyptOnline/Miscellaneous/000002/0207000000000000001038.htm
https://web.archive.org/web/20070928001729/http://www.sis.gov.eg/En/EgyptOnline/Miscellaneous/000002/0207000000000000001446.htm
http://countrystudies.us/egypt/55.htm
https://web.archive.org/web/20070930230227/http://www.sis.gov.eg/En/Pub/yearbook/yearbook2006/110104000000000001.htm
http://www.citypopulation.de/Egypt.html
http://scriptorium.lib.duke.edu/papyrus/records/971r.html
CAPMAS website
Specific

External links
  Population Distribution by Sex
  Average Size of Household and Sex Ratio
  Population Distribution by Educational Status
 Population Distribution by Age Groups
  Population Distribution by Marital Status
  No of Households & % of their Connection to Public Utilities
   2006 Census Analysis Series

Demographics of Egypt
Egypt